The Delancey Street/Essex Street station is a station complex shared by the BMT Nassau Street Line and the IND Sixth Avenue Lines of the New York City Subway, located at the intersection of Essex and Delancey Streets on the Lower East Side of Manhattan, just west of the Williamsburg Bridge. It is served by the:

F and J trains at all times
M train at all times except late nights
Z skip-stop  and <F> trains during rush hours in the peak direction

In addition to the two track levels—the BMT platforms are on the upper level, and the IND platforms are on the lower—an intermediate mezzanine built for the IND platforms provides the passenger connection between the two lines. As the BMT and the IND were originally separate systems, the transfer passageway was not within fare control until July 1, 1948. The full-time entrance is on the north side of Delancey Street, on either side of Essex Street.



Station layout 

Since June 2010, both the F and the M operate local along the Sixth Avenue Line north of the Delancey Street/Essex Street station. This resulted in many riders waiting in the stairwells connecting the Sixth Avenue Line's lower-level northbound platform, where the F stops, and the Nassau Street Line's upper-level southbound platform, where the M stops before merging onto the Sixth Avenue Line northbound. This phenomenon did not occur in other stations where two services have separate platforms before merging into the same direction, such as 50th Street–Eighth Avenue. In 2017, the MTA installed train-arrival "countdown clocks" across the New York City Subway system, which show how much time will elapse until the next train arrives on each respective platform.

Exits 

Both the IND and the BMT stations have additional closed exits. The IND station had four additional exits; two were at both the north end of the station at Rivington Street and the other two were at the south end at Broome Street. Two of the staircases were sealed on street level, but metal trapdoors block the other two. A former exit to the southeastern corner of Rivington Street and Essex Street, adjacent to the rear of the Essex Street Market building, remains as a northern emergency exit, and a former exit to the southeastern corner of Broome Street and Essex Street similarly remains as a southern emergency exit.

As part of the construction of the nearby Essex Crossing development, Site 9 (120 Essex Street), located on the east side of Essex Street between Rivington and Delancey Streets, contains an easement for a future elevator entrance.

BMT Nassau Street Line platforms 

The Essex Street station (announced as Delancey Street–Essex Street) on the BMT Nassau Street Line has three tracks, one side platform, and one island platform. The side platform is used by trains coming from the Williamsburg Bridge. The other two tracks serve the island platform. The middle track, which was formerly the peak-direction express track, is now used for outbound J and Z trains traveling over the Williamsburg Bridge on weekdays and late nights, as well as short turning M trains during weekends and late weekday evenings.

After a 2004 reconfiguration, the former northbound local track south of this station was taken out of regular service. It was only used for occasional reroutes from Chambers Street until 2010. The Chrystie Street Connection between Broadway–Lafayette Street and Essex Street was not used for regular revenue service from 1976 to 2010. On June 28, 2010, with the re-routing of M trains to the IND Sixth Avenue Line and IND Queens Boulevard Line, the connection again saw regular use for those aforementioned trains only.

This station is a bottleneck for eastbound trains, which are frequently delayed momentarily at this station because the island platform’s two eastbound tracks merge into one track upon leaving the station and before crossing the Williamsburg Bridge.

History 

Next to the Brooklyn-bound local track is the closed Williamsburg Bridge Trolley Terminal, which was built along with the subway station and opened several months earlier. The terminal consisted of eight turning loops with low-level platforms which were used for trolley service from 1908 to 1948 that traveled over the Williamsburg Bridge to different parts of Brooklyn.

The underground terminal for the subway adjacent to the trolley terminal opened on September 16, 1908. The station initially contained only two tracks which ended at the west end of the station. It also had an additional southern side platform adjacent to the trolley terminal, with the station organized in a Spanish solution.  The station was rebuilt for through service from 1911 to 1913 for the Centre Street Subway to extend to Chambers Street. The rest of the subway line has four tracks while there was room at Essex Street station for only three tracks and two platforms. There is provision for a fourth track to run through the trolley terminal area and join the subway west of the trolley terminal, should a four-track subway station be wanted.

For many years, the elevated train service was very intensive, and the fourth track at Essex Street would have been useful to handle the crowds, but at the same time, the trolley service was also well patronized, so no expansion was ever proposed. This would have added a second side platform to the south of the southernmost track, directly against the trolley terminal. The island platform would have been demolished to make room for the fourth track; alternatively, the fourth track would have been constructed adjacent to the southernmost track, resulting in a 2 side-platform, 1 island-platformed station, similar to the IRT platforms at Atlantic Avenue-Barclays Center.

After streetcar service ended in 1948, the former track area on the south side of the bridge was rebuilt into auto lanes with a new ramp from street level closing off the former downhill ramp to the trolley terminal. The trolley terminal itself, however, was left vacant, and small portions were converted to storerooms and an emergency exit to the southern corners of Norfolk Street and Delancey Street. The vacant space was the proposed location of the LowLine, a planned underground park, but after fundraising proved unsuccessful, the project was indefinitely postponed in February 2020. Prior to 1913, the BMT station was also known as Delancey Street.

Image gallery

IND Sixth Avenue Line platforms 

The Delancey Street station (also announced as Delancey Street–Essex Street) on the IND Sixth Avenue Line has two tracks and two side platforms. The station has a part-time booth on the south side of Delancey Street and has two street staircases. Crossovers connect both platforms to the BMT platforms, which are above and perpendicular to the IND platforms. Both platforms have a renovated medium Parma violet trim line with a black border, as well as renovated tile captions in a different font, spaced farther apart, and far lower on the wall than the originals. Only the original mosaic name tablets remain, which read "DELANCEY ST." in white sans-serif lettering on a dark Parma violet background and medium Parma violet border. The southbound platform is lined with indigo I-beam columns, while the northbound platform has tiled columns, both having the standard black station name plate with white lettering every other columns. In a departure from the norm of recent restorations, northbound platform columns that don't have the station name plate feature a large "D" composed of four tiles.

The station formerly had two mezzanine areas, split by the BMT station. Twelve staircases, six on each platform, led to the mezzanine. Most were removed; only the stairs at the extreme north end and the extreme south end of both platforms remain as stairways to emergency exits and storage space.

There are two large wall-sized pieces of artwork, one on each wall where the staircase exits and transfers are located. The artist for both glass mosaics is Ming Fay (2004). The artwork on the downtown side is titled Shad Crossing and details two giant shad fish swimming, along with another wall mosaic of blue waters. In the late 19th century, shad were found along the Hudson River when new immigrants came to New York, many of whom settled on the Lower East Side. The new staircase to the relocated full-time booth also has another painting of a shad wrapped around the bottom of the stairs.

The uptown platform is titled Delancey Orchard and has a cherry orchard tree mosaic, which symbolized the tree owned by the Delancey family in the 18th century. Miniature versions appear along all staircases leading from the Delancey Street platforms to either fare control.

Notes

References

External links 

Subway station:
 
 
 Station Reporter – Delancey Street/Essex Street Complex
 MTA's Arts For Transit – Delancey Street–Essex Street
 Delancey Street and Essex Street entrance from Google Maps Street View
 Delancey Street and Norfolk Street entrance from Google Maps Street View
 IND platforms from Google Maps Street View
Westbound BMT Platform from Google Maps Street View
Eastbound BMT Platform from Google Maps Street View
Trolley terminal:
 Abandoned Stations – "Williamsburg Bridge Railway terminal". Joseph Brennan, Columbia University, 2001.

Delancey Street–Essex Street (New York City Subway)
IND Sixth Avenue Line stations
New York City Subway transfer stations
New York City Subway stations in Manhattan
Lower East Side
BMT Nassau Street Line stations
Railway stations in the United States opened in 1948
1948 establishments in New York City